Ezgi Eyüboğlu (born 15 June 1988) is a Turkish actress.

Early life
Eyüboğlu was born on 15 June 1988 in İstanbul, Turkey as Ezgi Eyüboğlu. Her father is a banker, and her mother is a chemistry teacher. Her paternal grandfather's relatives are Bedri Rahmi Eyüboğlu and Sabahattin Eyüboğlu. Her maternal family is Albanian. After completing her graduation in Istanbul University, Department of Economics, she completed her master's degree in advanced acting in Bahçeşehir University.

Career
She started acting in 2010. She first acted in a few commercials. Then in 2011, she took a role in the TV series Kalbim Seni Seçti. Thus, she entered the acting completely. In 2012, she rose to prominence from the historical fiction series Muhteşem Yüzyıl, playing as the role of Aybige Hatun, a Crimean princess. Simultaneously, she played the role of Zeynep in the series Sudan Bıkmış Balıklar. In 2013-2014, she played the role of Cemre Arsoy in the series İntikam. In 2014 she starred in the series Yasak and Ulan Istanbul. In 2015, she portrayed the character of Kumsal Güçlu in the series Adı Mutuluk along with her co-star Kaan Yıldırım. In 2017-2018, she depicted the character of Melike (Ahsen) in the historical fiction series Payitaht: Abdülhamid. In 2018, she portrayed the character of Çilek in the comedy film Yol Arkadaşım 2.

Personal life
On 14 May 2016, Eyüboğlu married Kaan Yıldırım in the Esma Sultan Mansion located in Ortaköy. However, the couple divorced on 26 June 2019.

Filmography

References

External links
 
 

Living people
1988 births
Actresses from Istanbul
Turkish television actresses
21st-century Turkish actresses
Turkish film actresses
Turkish people of Albanian descent